Dániel Zsóri (born 14 October 2000) is a Romanian-born Hungarian professional footballer who plays as a forward for MTK Budapest.

Early life
Zsóri was born in Oradea, Romania on 14 October 2000. He grew up in Satu Nou, Mișca Commune in Arad County. When he was 10 years old, he moved to Békéscsaba to play in the Békéscsaba 1912 Előre youth academy.

Zsóri holds dual Romanian and Hungarian citizenship. He has stated that he would prefer to play for the Hungary national team over the Romania national team if given the option.

Club career

Debrecen 
Debrecen signed Zsóri in September 2017. He was promoted into their senior squad in 2018–19 by manager András Herczeg, who selected him for his senior bow in the Magyar Kupa against Teskánd on 31 October 2018. Zsóri made his debut in the Nemzeti Bajnokság I during a home fixture with league leaders Ferencváros on 16 February, with the forward being substituted on in place of Márk Szécsi before going on to score a ninetieth minute overhead kick at the Nagyerdei Stadion for Debrecen to win 2–1; the goal was shortlisted for the FIFA Puskás Award, which he later won.

Fehérvár 
On 1 September 2019, Zsóri completed a transfer to Magyar Kupa holders Fehérvár. After five appearances in five months for them, Zsóri was loaned out in January 2020 to Nemzeti Bajnokság II side Budaörs. He scored the winner on his debut against Vác on 2 February. He featured four times in total for Budaörs, in a season that was prematurely ended due to the COVID-19 pandemic. In the succeeding June, Zsóri again departed Fehérvár on loan after agreeing terms with newly promoted Nemzeti Bajnokság I team Budafok.

MTK Budapest
On 18 July 2022, Zsóri signed a three-year contract with MTK Budapest.

Career statistics
.

Honours
Individual
FIFA Puskás Award: 2019

References

2000 births
People from Oradea
Naturalized citizens of Hungary 
Romanian people of Hungarian descent
Living people
Romanian footballers
Hungarian footballers
Hungary under-21 international footballers
Association football forwards
Debreceni VSC players
Fehérvár FC players
Budaörsi SC footballers
Budafoki LC footballers
Zalaegerszegi TE players
MTK Budapest FC players
Nemzeti Bajnokság I players
Nemzeti Bajnokság II players